Sar Tall (also Romanized as Sartal) is a village in Nazil Rural District, Nukabad District, Khash County, Sistan and Baluchestan Province, Iran. At the 2006 census, its population was 30, in 10 families.

References 

Populated places in Khash County